This is a list of Brazilian television related events from 1988.

Events

Debuts

Television shows

1970s
Turma da Mônica (1976–present)

1980s
Xou da Xuxa (1986-1992)

Ending this year

Births
6 October - Kayky Brito, actor

Deaths

See also
1988 in Brazil